Prodigals is a play (2011) by Sean Minogue about a group of twenty-somethings in Sault Ste. Marie, Ontario who spend their days drinking in a bar while awaiting the results of a friend's murder trial.

Release 

The play premiered in May 2011 in Vancouver, British Columbia as the first original production of the Twenty-Something Theatre company. Described as a "notable accomplishment" by one critic and "an impressive and polished first play" by another, the premiere was directed by Peter Boychuk, produced by Sabrina Evertt, stage manager Aliya Rozenberg and featured Tara Pratt as Jen, Timothy Johnston as Wesley, Jameson Parker as Greg, Brandyn Eddy as Nips, Aslam Husain as Eliot, and Kirsten Kilburn as Nina.

A workshop production was previously produced in May 2010 at Vancouver's Havana restaurant and theatre, which also elicited positive reactions from critics.

Feature film adaptation 

Minogue adapted his play into a feature screenplay and sold the option to Vancouver-based production company Whiskaye Films, the company behind the White Ninja web series. The film stars David Alpay and Sara Canning, both of whom previously appeared on The Vampire Diaries television series. Shot in Sault Ste. Marie and Vancouver, the film premiered on November 30, 2017 at the Whistler Film Festival in Whistler, British Columbia, Canada.

Prodigals the film will be brought to theatres in spring 2018 by Toronto-based indie distributor LevelFilm.

References 

2011 plays
Northern Ontario in fiction
One-act plays
Canadian plays adapted into films
Plays set in Canada